José Moreno Hernández (born August 7, 1962) is an American engineer and former NASA astronaut. He currently serves as a Regent of the University of California.

Hernández was assigned to the crew of Space Shuttle mission STS-128. He also served as chief of the Materials and Processes branch of Johnson Space Center. Hernández previously developed equipment for full-field digital mammography at Lawrence Livermore National Laboratory.

In October 2011, Hernández, at the urging of President Barack Obama, ran for Congress as a Democrat in California's newly redrawn 10th congressional district in the U.S. House of Representatives. He won the Democratic nomination, but lost the 2012 general election to freshman incumbent Representative Jeff Denham.

Early life 
Hernández was born in French Camp, California, but calls Stockton, California, his hometown. His family is from La Piedad, Michoacán, Mexico, with indigenous Purépecha roots.  In an August 25, 2009, conversation with President Felipe Calderón of Mexico, Hernández stated that as a child, he lived half the year in La Piedad and half in the United States. As a child, Hernández worked alongside his family and other farmworkers throughout the fields of California, harvesting crops and moving from one town to another.  He attended many schools and didn't learn to speak English until he was 12. His first memory of space is about adjusting the television in order to watch the Apollo 17 mission in 1972.

José Hernández participated in Upward Bound during high school, a Federal TRIO program that prepares students for college. He graduated from Franklin High School in Stockton. While in college, he was involved in the Mathematics, Engineering, Science Achievement (MESA) program, an academic preparation program that provides support to students from educationally disadvantaged backgrounds so they can attain four-year degrees in science, technology, engineering or math (STEM) fields.

He earned a B.S. in Electrical Engineering from the University of the Pacific in 1984. In 1986, Hernández earned an M.S. in electrical and computer engineering from the University of California, Santa Barbara.

Engineering career 
Hernández worked from 1990 to 2004 at Lawrence Livermore National Laboratory in Livermore, California. While there, Hernández, along with a commercial colleague, developed the first full-field digital mammography imaging system. This invention aids in the early detection of breast cancer.

NASA career 

In 2001, Hernández joined the Johnson Space Center, in Houston, Texas.

After three years and being turned down eleven times for astronaut training by NASA, Hernández was selected in May 2004.  In February 2006 he completed Astronaut Candidate Training that included scientific and technical briefings, intensive instruction in Shuttle and International Space Station systems, physiological training, T-38 flight training, and water and wilderness survival training. On completing this initial training, Hernández was assigned to the Shuttle Branch to support Kennedy Space Center Operations in support of Shuttle launch and landing preparations.

In May 2007, Hernández served as an aquanaut during the NEEMO 12 mission aboard the Aquarius underwater laboratory, living and working underwater for eleven days.

Hernández worked various technical assignments until his selection on July 15, 2008, as a mission specialist on the STS-128 mission, which launched on August 28, 2009.  While in orbit, Hernández became the first person to use the Spanish language in space while tweeting.

The STS-128 mission ended its 14-day journey on September 11, 2009, at Edwards Air Force Base, California, at 5:53 pm PST.

Congressional campaign 

During the summer of 2009, Hernández told the Stockton Record that he would consider not running against fellow Democrat Dennis Cardoza in his Stockton-based district.

Hernández announced at Pacific Union College on September 29, 2011, that at the urging of President Barack Obama he was considering a run for the U.S. House of Representatives and would announce his decision on October 11, 2011.  He announced his candidacy as promised on October 11 via Twitter by linking to his campaign website.
Hernández made his first public campaign appearance on January 14, 2012, at a Democratic Candidate Forum in Tracy at the Holiday Inn Express & Suites.

In March 2012, Bell, McAndrews & Hiltachk, a law firm with links to the California Republican Party, sued in Sacramento County Superior Court to block Hernández from describing himself as an "astronaut/scientist/engineer" on the June ballot. The lawsuit stated that "astronaut is not a title one carries for life"; the election code requires the description be accurate for the previous calendar year. 
"Allowing a candidate to use the profession of 'astronaut' when he hasn't served in that profession recently is akin to allowing someone to use a title of 'sailor' when they no longer own or operate a ship," said Jennifer Kerns, a California Republican Party spokeswoman. On March 29, a Sacramento County Superior Court judge ruled that Hernández could be described as an astronaut on the June 5 primary ballot.

On the campaign trail, Hernández was criticized for having a 2010 personal tax lien imposed by the IRS and paid in 2012. Hernández attacked his opponent, Denham, for his tax liens imposed against his business in 2003 and paid in 2003.

Endorsements 
Hernández received the endorsement of Democracy for America, and was selected as one of the Dean Dozen supported in 2012. In November 2012, Hernández lost to the incumbent, Congressman Jeff Denham, in the General Election for California's new 10th District. Hernández finished in the polls with 46 percent of the vote.

Fundraising 
Most of Hernández's campaign funds came from outside his district and many donations came from left-wing political action committees and public employee unions. Speaking of his fundraising Hernández said, "there aren't any special interest groups that are going to come back and say I have to vote for something. I don't believe they're going to influence me in making decisions on what's best for my district." Hernández said that he does not think organizations like teachers unions to be special interest groups.

Speculation 
Since his 2012 loss, Hernández has made multiple public statements regarding potential future campaigns. In March 2016, Hernández said, "I ran for Congress in 2012 but I lost in a close race. Now I'm thinking about making a comeback, maybe in 2018."

Hernández filed papers to challenge incumbent Democratic Representative Josh Harder in the 9th district in 2022, but ultimately did not run.

Political views

Immigration 
Hernandez made headlines soon after his return to Earth as a result of comments he made on Mexican television advocating that the United States legalize undocumented immigrants. He does not favor a guest worker program or a secure ID program.

Taxes 
Hernández supported California's Proposition 30, a ballot measure proposed by Gov. Jerry Brown to increase income taxes on those earning more than $250,000 and raise the sales tax rate by a quarter-cent for everyone. To balance the federal budget, Hernández says there needs to be a combination of tax increases and budget cuts.

Personal life 

Hernández is married to his wife, Adela and has five children, Julio, Karina, Vanessa, Marisol, and Antonio.  For several years, his wife ran a Mexican restaurant just outside the Johnson Space Center gates, called Tierra Luna Grill, which is Spanish for Earth Moon Grill. In 2014, Hernández joined the Board of Directors for the nonprofit humanitarian space agency, SpaceUnited. Hernández owns a 20 acre vineyard near Lodi, California, and in 2021 began bottling wine under the Tierra Luna Cellars label.

Awards and honors 
Hernández has earned or been awarded:

 Graduate Engineering Minority Fellow (GEM) (1985)
 Hispanic Engineer National Achievement Award, "Outstanding Technical Contribution" (1995)
 Society of Mexican American Engineers and Scientists (MAES) "Medalla de Oro" recipient for professional and community contributions (1999)
 U.S. Department of Energy "Outstanding Performance Commendation" (2000)
 NASA Service Awards (2002, 2003)
 Lawrence Livermore National Laboratory "Outstanding Engineer Award" (2001)
 Upward Bound National TRIO Achiever Award (2001)
 Eta Kappa Nu Electrical Engineering Honor Society member and awarded an honorary LL.D. degree from University of California at Santa Barbara (2006).
 José Hernández Middle School, in San Jose, California, is named after him
 University of California, Santa Barbara 2015 Distinguished Alumnus
 United States Hispanic Leadership Institute, 2016 National Hispanic Hero Award
 University of the Pacific 2019 Medallion of Excellence for outstanding and exceptional service to University of the Pacific, their profession and community.

Filmography

See also

References

External links 
 
 Jose Hernandez Reaching For The Stars! Foundation
 
 Spacefacts biography of José Hernández

1962 births
American electrical engineers
American people of Purépecha descent
American people of Mexican descent
Aquanauts
American astronaut-politicians
California Democrats
Lawrence Livermore National Laboratory staff
Living people
People from Stockton, California
University of California, Santa Barbara alumni
University of the Pacific (United States) alumni
NASA civilian astronauts
People from French Camp, California
Engineers from California
Space Shuttle program astronauts
Hispanic and Latino American scientists
Hispanic and Latino American aviators